Derrylaughan Kevin Barrys is a Gaelic Athletic Association club based along the Washing Bay area east of the parish of Clonoe in County Tyrone, Northern Ireland.

History
Previous clubs existed in 1903 (‘Rising Sons of Goff’), 1917–19 and 1923 (Aughamullan Erin’s Hope/Pearses and Kevin Barrys). Washingbay Shamrocks flourished in period 1929-36 and 1939–48; won junior league in 1929, Dr. Collins Cup in 1932, SFC in 1934 (finalists in 1931), JFC in 1942. 

Today's club was formed in 1945, and named after Kevin Barry.

The club saw success winning the Junior Football Championship in 1949. They beat Dungannon in the final in a low scoring game 2-3 to 1-1.

Derrylaughan would become a permanent fixture in the senior ranks for the next 40 years winning two county titles. The late 1950s and 1960s were a golden era for the club reaching county finals in 1957, 1962, 1964, 1965 and 1966 before eventually claiming the O'Neill Cup in 1967 with victory over Carrickmore Saint Colmcille's. .

While that team wouldn't challenge for top honours again the club was building quietly and claimed the first Tyrone Minor championship title in 1977. This team would provide a large number of players for the 1981 team that would claim the O'Neill Cup once again defeating Carrickmore in the final. The club rounded off a fantastic year for the community as they also won the county Under 21 title. Team manager on this occasion was Mena Devlin. Mena had been the team captain in 1967.

Having suffered relegation to Division 2 in the early 1990s, the club struggled to regain their place in senior football but did eventually make their way back up claiming the 2003 Division 2 league title. They won this title again in 2006 but with the league restructuring the stay in senior football was short-lived.

Derrylaughan regained their place in the top tier of Tyrone football, and completed the full set of championship titles when they beat Urney in the final of the 2010 Intermediate championship.

The club has worked to update its facilities through the years. New playing fields were opened in 1981 and dressing rooms in 1984. Redevelopment work in the late 1990s saw the clubhouse upgraded. A second pitch was opened in 2004. 

Derrylaughan regained their senior status winning the 2010 Tyrone Intermediate Championship following victory over Urney.

The club are currently back in Senior football after winning the intermediate league in 2017.

Honours
 Tyrone Senior Football Championship (2)
 1967, 1981
 Tyrone Intermediate Football Championship 
 2010
 Tyrone Junior Football Championship (1)
 1949
 Tyrone Under 21 Football Championship (1)
 1981
 Tyrone Minor Football Championship (1)
 1977

External links
 Kevin Barrys GAA

Gaelic games clubs in County Tyrone
Gaelic football clubs in County Tyrone